Sergei Vladislavovich Peterson (born 10 January 2001) is a Russian football player. He plays for FC Tver.

Club career
He made his debut in the Russian Football National League for FC Krasnodar-2 on 4 October 2020 in a game against FC Nizhny Novgorod.

References

External links
 Profile by Russian Football National League
 

2001 births
People from Vyselkovsky District
Sportspeople from Krasnodar Krai
Living people
Russian footballers
Russia youth international footballers
Association football midfielders
FC Zenit-Izhevsk players
FC Krasnodar-2 players
Russian First League players
Russian Second League players